Jornadas de Protesta Nacional (lit. Days of National Protest) were a series of massive protests against the military dictatorship of Chile. The May 1983 protest was initially called by copper miners in northern Chile but grew top encompass large sectors of civil society. According to historians Gabriel Salazar and Julio Pinto it was the economic crisis of 1982 that triggered people to protests despite the severe repression of the Pinochet regime.

References 

Protests in Chile
May 1983 events in South America
1983 in Chile
1984 in Chile
1985 in Chile
1986 in Chile
Military dictatorship of Chile (1973–1990)